Tiruppattur Junction railway station is a railway station serving the town of Tiruppattur in Tamil Nadu, India.

The station is a part of the Salem railway division of the Southern Railway zone and connects the city to various parts of the state as well as the rest of the country.

History
This railway station was constructed by the South Indian Railway Company. It acted as a junction railway station during British India. A drought railway line was constructed by the Madras Railway (MR) between Krishnagiri to Thiruppathur in order to ameliorate the severe drought faced during the period of 1905.

The line connected Tirupattur to Krishnagiri, a length of 25 miles (40 km) and opened in 1905. The line was the property of Government, on whose behalf it was worked by the MR up to 31 December 1907. With effect from 1st January 1908 it was made over to the South Indian Railway (SIR) Company for maintenance and working.

Location and layout
The railway station is located off the Railway Colony of Tiruppattur.

Lines

 BG single line towards  via Jolarpettai Junction, .
 BG single line towards Salem Junction, Bommidi.

References

External links
 India Rail Info
 Southern Railways - Official Website
 PNR Status,Seat Availability,Train Schedule & Trains Between
 Train Running Status
 IRCTC - Online Ticket Booking
 Rail Distances & Routes

Salem railway division
Railway stations in Vellore district